Gymnastics events were competed at the 1982 Southern Cross Games in Rosario, Argentina.

Medal summary

Medal table

Artistic gymnastics

Men

Women

References 

South American Games
1982 South American Games
1982 Southern Cross Games